Giovanni Gaddi (after 1333–1383) was an Italian painter. He was the son of Taddeo Gaddi and the brother of Agnolo Gaddi. Giorgio Vasari wrote that Gaddi was a painter in his own right. He painted frescoes in Santo Spirito and was called to work in the Vatican under Urban V between 1367 and 1370.

External links 
 

1333 births
1383 deaths
14th-century Italian painters
Italian male painters
Painters from Tuscany
Giovanni